Anthony Circelli (born 18 November 1961) is an Italian ice hockey player. He competed in the men's tournaments at the 1992 Winter Olympics and the 1994 Winter Olympics.

References

1961 births
Living people
Olympic ice hockey players of Italy
Ice hockey players at the 1992 Winter Olympics
Ice hockey players at the 1994 Winter Olympics
Ice hockey people from Toronto